The celebrity edition of Pinoy Big Brother: Kumunity Season 10 premiered on Kapamilya Channel, Jeepney TV and A2Z on October 16, 2021. The first edition in the multi-part season, this edition featured contestants (known as Housemates) from the Celebrity Kumunity (portumentau of Kumu and community), which composes of people with a claim to fame.

The edition concluded on January 1, 2022, where Alyssa Valdez and Anji Salvacion were hailed as the edition's Top 2 housemates. Salvacion would go on to win the season, becoming the first celebrity to win since Daniel Matsunaga of All In.

Production

Housemate selection 
Like other celebrity editions, no formal auditions were held to determine this edition's roster of housemates.

Online Bahay ni Kuya
Throughout the run-up to the editions' premiere, a Kumu campaign was held to determine two celebrity housemates. This campaign was called Online Bahay ni Kuya ("Online Big Brother's House") and it consisted of online voting and challenges to its participants. Jordan Andrews and Benedix Ramos were announced as the winners of the campaign on October 15 and entered the house as official housemates.

Overview

The House
The facade of the Big Brother House was repainted with the colors of the Philippine flag. As the season started during the Filipino countdown to Christmas, the façade featured decorations such as lights and parol lanterns.

Theme songs
A cover of Toni Gonzaga and Sam Milby's "Sikat ang Pinoy" by the OPM band Agsunta and Pinoy rapper Kritiko was used alongside "Pinoy Tayo" in this edition.

The eviction theme song for this edition is entitled "Piece Of The Puzzle", written and performed by Trisha Denise Campañer.

Twists
 Online Bahay Ni Kuya – Kumu users will have the chance to become official housemates after finishing several online tasks via Kumu prepared by the show.
 Nomination Immunity Pass – A power given to winners of tasks or challenges held on or before their Kumunitys stay in the house, this will give its holder the option to give themselves immunity for a round of their choosing.
 Follower Sprint – An online live stream challenge wherein the housemate who had gained the most number of new followers on Kumu will be given a Nomination Immunity Pass.
 Kumunity Decides! – Kumu users, through an online poll on the app on the shows daily livestream, can drop virtual gifts to a housemate of their choice via Kumu's gifting system and are collectively given a power to decide and give a certain challenge(s), task(s), or advantage(s) to a/the housemate(s) who had received the highest number of vote(s).
 Head of Household – Carried over from the previous season, those who earned the title were granted immunity from being nominated in the upcoming nomination week.
 Padaluck – Also used in the previous season, the public has the chance to give an advantage to a housemate. The advantage was given to the housemate who had received the most "padalucks" or virtual gifts through Kumu's livestream gifting system.
 Powers – Various housemates from the Celebrity and Adult Kumunities were given powers for completing tasks given by Big Brother, such as by giving them special and secret tasks, and the Follower Sprint task.
 Houseguest for a Week – The top Kumu live streamer who will earn the most Kumu gifts on November 6 to 12, 2021 during the Celebrity Edition will become a houseguest for a week.
 Unli-Voting – From the second to the eighth evictions, the public is given the power to vote past the voting limit through SMS and Kumu for the 48 hours preceding the closing of the poll. It was discontinued on the final week of the edition in response to the twist's poor reception.
 Pinoy Big Brother Games 2021 – The housemates were divided into three teams, and the team with the most points earned after three rounds of games will earn immunity from the sixth celebrity nominations.
 Kuya's Christmas Elf – One of the top 10 Kumu streamers will become Big Brother's Christmas elf. As an elf, he or she is going to deliver to the housemates their given tasks and some of Big Brother's messages virtually or in person.
 The Ten Million Diamonds Challenge – The Final 5 housemates of the edition will compete to earn a portion of the ten million diamonds in order to help themselves from getting evicted in their respective final evictions, and to become one of the Top 2 of their respective Kumunities.

Housemates
The housemates for the season was incrementally revealed daily in the show's social media accounts from October 6, 2021 to October 16, 2021, and were revealed daily on the show's social media accounts; the first batch of celebrity housemates were revealed October 6, with the last batch being revealed on October 9. On October 14, it was revealed that three more celebrity housemates are yet to be named.

During the launch night, it was announced via the show's Kumu livestream that Kyle Echarri will enter the House after completing his quarantine; together with Chie Filomeno, though at different intervals, they entered on October 20. Albie Casiño entered on October 27 while the two celebrity live streamers (Jordan Andrews and Benedix Ramos) were also introduced.

 Alyssa Valdez: A volleyball player known as the "Heartstrong Phenom of Batangas", her friendship with Samantha was adored by viewers, gaining the nickname of "SamLy" in the process. She was the sole housemate from the edition to not get nominated.
 Anji Salvacion: A signer of Russian descent called the "Singing Sweetheart of Siargao", her personality polarized viewers as she gained a lot of supporters with her passionate character, singing ability, and strong performance in tasks, while simultaneously getting a lot of critics due to her antagonistic approach towards KD, resentment towards Alexa for helping out KD after she told him that "there will never be a chance", and allegedly benefitting from management favoritism
 Samantha Bernardo: Called the "Bread Queen-er of Palawan", she was very popular with viewers whether it be for her friendship with Alyssa, or for her helping out KD during his struggles in the earlier part of the edition.
 Daisy "Madam Inutz" Lopez: Known as the "Mama-bentang Live Seller of Cavite", her feisty personality was initially loved by viewers, especially with her nominating Chie for allegedly contributing nothing but her beauty. The viewers cooled off on her during the latter portion of the edition due to her involvement in the Alexa-Brenda-Eian love triangle as well as her manager single-handedly saving her from eviction
 Brenda Mage: Billed as the "Fun-Along Comedian of Cagayan de Oro", he was known for his strong performance in tasks as well as his controversial personality inside the house owing to a romantic interest with Eian causing him to constantly bump heads with Alexa in the process
 Alexa Ilacad: A longtime ABS-CBN actress called the "Smartista Unica Hija of Pasig", her stay in the PBB house was mostly known for a conflict with Albie over peanut butter, discussing her mental health, conflicts with Eian and Brenda, and her helping KD as he was struggling after consecutive nominations and being turned down by Anji
 KD Estrada: A musician called the "Musical Wonder Boy of Parañaque", he badly struggled in the early portion of the edition owing to depression and anxiety as he was nominated three straight times, was turned down by Anji, and walked out after he found out that he was nominated for a third week in a row. Despite those struggles, housemates like Alexa and Samantha helped him adjust and recover afterwards, and he was visibly in better shape on the latter half of the edition.
 Jordan Andrews: Called the "Musical Dreamchaser of London", he was mildly popular among viewers but garnered criticism for being "boring"
 Eian Rances: Billed as the "Striving Streamer of Quezon", he was a controversial housemate due to his relationships with Alexa and Brenda, allegedly "using" the former once he found out that she was popular with the viewers
 TJ Valderrama: Dubbed the "Laughter Lodi of Manila", he was very unpopular with the viewers for manipulating Anji and KD, as well as being seen inappropriately touching Shanaia several times in a Kumu livestream, which lead to calls for him to be force-evicted. He was the only housemate to get a negative vote tally for the entire edition.
 Kyle Echarri: An actor and signer who was a core member of the "Gold Squad" prior to entering the PBB house, his stay alienated fans of his tandem with Francine Diaz, known as "KyCine", after Kyle became close with Chie. He also got criticized for accusing KD of "copying his style" days prior to his eviction

 Subsequent events 
Alyssa Valdez, chose to relinquish her spot in the Biga-10 on Day 197. She made the decision as a result of her prior commitments as part of the Philippines women's national volleyball team, which will compete in the 2021 Southeast Asian Games, conflicting with the schedule allotted for the Biga-10's stay in the house. Samantha, by virtue of having the next most votes in the final eviction poll, took her place in the Biga-10 and the Celebrity Top 2 as a result.

Brenda and Madam Inutz were selected to compete for a wildcard spot in the Biga-10.

 Houseguests 

 Online Guesting 
 Day 22: Lucky 7 Big Winner Maymay Entrata had a dance number with the celebrity housemates after they were tasked to do a choreography for her song "Amakabogera."
 Day 28: AC Bonifacio promoted her new single under Star Magic Records entitled "Fool No Mo" by playing its music video for the housemates and, through a recorded video message, told them to put a bandage and share a story about how they overcame an adversity and healed from it.
 Day 33: 2020 Tokyo Olympics silver medalist Nesthy Petecio gave a message to the housemates, and then declared the Pinoy Big Brother Games 2021 open.
 Day 34: 2020 Tokyo Olympics bronze medalist Eumir Marcial sent a good luck greeting to the housemates before their land swimming competition in the Pinoy Big Brother Games 2021.
 Day 57: AC Bonifacio and former 737 regular housemate Zeus Collins were invited by Big Brother to judge the housemates' performance for their Sikat ang Sayaw ng Pinoy weekly task.
 Day 67: For winning the Kuya's Christmas Elf Kumu Campaign, US-based Alyssa "Ysang" Ramos became Big Brother's house elf for a week.
 Day 75: Ogie Diaz hosted the final tell all of the Celebrity Final 5 together with this season's former Celebrity housemates.

 Physical Guesting 
 Day 54: For winning the Houseguest for a Week Kumu Campaign, Aly Palma spent a week in the House to help the housemates with the Sikat ang Sayaw ng Pinoy weekly task.

Tasks
Weekly tasks

Notes

  A total of 21 game violations were earned during Kyle's turn to play the game. He was able to get 38 hits which gave him to earn a total of 17 tickets. For Alexa, she earned 22 hits while incurring 40 game violations. This gave her -18 tickets. KD, on the other hand, was able to make 33 hits while earning 24 game violations. He earned a total of 9 tickets. For the first round of the Soccer Arcade, all in all, they earned 8 tickets.
  For the second round of the Soccer Arcade, Eian was able to make a total of -5 tickets from the 18 hits and the 23 game violations he had earned. For Jordan, he earned 27 hits while incurring only 4 game violations. This gave him 23 tickets. Shanaia, on the other hand, was able to make 22 hits while earning 9 game violations. She earned a total of 13 tickets. For the last game for this round, Anji was able to make 22 hits while earning 14 game violations; she earned a total of 8 tickets. All in all, they earned 39 tickets.
  Kyle was selected not to participate since all the positions in the game were already filled.
  Shanaia was selected not to participate since all the positions in the game were already filled.
  Benedix and Shanaia were in the house when the task was performed. The episode for this task was aired on December 12, 2021. The celebrity housemates received the total average score of 89% from the judges.

Other tasks

Challenges
Head of Household

Group challenges

Notes

Celebrities
 Jordan was exempt from performing this challenge as he entered the house four days before the second nomination proceedings.
 Kyle participated in this challenge before being evicted on the same night. As the result of this challenge was presented on Day 44, Kyle's name and final length were excluded from the leaderboard.

The Ten Million Diamonds Challenge

Nomination history
In each standard nomination round, every housemate is called to the confession room to nominate two of their housemates for eviction with the first nominee receiving 2 points and the other receiving 1 point. The housemates with the most nomination points (usually 3) will then face the public vote to determine the evictee for that round. However, Big Brother may automatically nominate a housemate for rule violations or a failure in a task. On the other hand, immunity may be awarded as a reward for accomplishing a task. Big Brother may forcibly evict a housemate for severe violations and a housemate may opt to voluntarily leave the house. In certain circumstances, the nomination process may be delayed as a result of a pending challenge or task.

For the purposes of uniformity with the other previous season articles, the launch night is marked as Day 1, not the day after it.

Legend
  Housemate received immunity after becoming a Head of Household.
  Housemate received immunity after winning or finishing a task or challenge; or was exempt from the nominations due to being a new entrant.
  Housemate was automatically nominated as a result of a twist or a rule violation.
  Housemate was up for eviction but was removed from the list of nominated housemates after being saved by another housemate or by oneself.
  Housemate received positive nomination points from another housemate.

Notes

  Albie was exempt from the nominations for being a new entrant. He entered the House on Day 12, four days before the first nomination night.
  Jordan was exempt from the nominations for being a new entrant. He entered the House on Day 19, four days before the second nomination night.
  Madam Inutz and Samantha both became the Heads of Household for the week after they tied in the challenge.
  The group consisting of Benedix, Brenda, Eian, Karen and TJ won immunity after earning the most points in the Pinoy Big Brother Games 2021.
  This eviction is a double eviction wherein two nominees were evicted.
  The nominations for the sixth eviction was determined via a challenge between Yellow Team (Anji, Brenda, KD, Benedix, Madam Inutz, Samantha and Shanaia) and the Blue Team (Alyssa, Alexa, Jordan, TJ, Karen and Eian) wherein the Blue Team won and was declared safe. As nominees from the prior nominations, Alexa, Karen, and TJ may only be safe for this round of nominations if they were to be saved in the fifth eviction night.
  Brenda used the Power to Save he won on Day 9 on herself for this round of nominations, removing himself from the list of nominees for that week.
  For this week, the housemates had a face to face nomination unlike the previous nomination rounds.
  Madam Inutz used her Nomination Immunity Pass for this round, giving her immunity for this week.
  This nomination week is similar to All In season's All In nominations, wherein all housemates who received votes were up for eviction.
  This nomination round had a positive nomination unlike the previous nomination rounds.
  Alyssa and Brenda both became safe from nomination after they tied the most positive nomination points.

Kumunity beneficiaries
 Philippine Mental Health Association, Inc. — A special task was given to Albie to organize a Kumu livestream show where all Kumu diamonds collected will be given to this Kumunity. In addition, the proceeds from their Sa Linyang Kainan weekly task, which they successfully completed, were also given to this Kumunity in the amount of one hundred thousand pesos (₱100,000).
 Philippine Accessible Disability Services, Inc. (PADS) — A special task was given to Alyssa and Madam Inutz to walk using crutches, and get their daily food supply by roaming around the swimming pool ten times. Having completed the task, they gave Verniel Faustrilla, a differently-abled athlete and PADS member, with new arm crutches and sports wheelchair. In addition, after successfully completing the Makuha Ka Sa Tingin weekly task, the housemates gave the amount of one hundred thousand pesos (₱100,000) to this Kumunity.
 Victims of Typhoon Odette''' — With needed supplies provided by ABS-CBN Foundation, the housemates packed relief goods for distribution to the families affected by Typhoon Odette. A special task was given to Alexa, Anji, Brenda, Eian, Jordan, and KD to organize a Kumu livestream show where all Kumu diamonds collected will be given to the victims and communities affected. In addition, after successfully completing the Andito Tayo Para Sa Isa't Isa weekly task, the housemates gave the amount of one hundred thousand pesos (₱100,000) to this Kumunity, but Big Brother has added more funds to the initial amount and increased to one million pesos (₱1,000,000) as an incentive for the housemates' sacrifices for that week.

S-E voting system result

Reception
Praises
During this edition, the show opened a conversation, both on the show and online, about the mental health struggles of the celebrity housemates. With the help of the show's resident psychologist-psychiatrist Dr. Randy Dellosa, mental health conditions were being addressed on the show, including KD Estrada's anxiety, Albie Casiño's attention deficit hyperactivity disorder, Alexa Ilacad's body dysmorphia, and the housemates' reaction and response on dealing with people diagnosed with such conditions. As such conversations remain a taboo in Filipino society, the move has won praise and appreciation from netizens for normalizing mental health-related conversations.

Controversies and criticisms
Unli-Voting and alleged favoritism of Anji Salvacion
The second nomination week of the celebrity edition saw a tight battle between the set of nominees. Two days prior to the end of voting, the management decided to remove the Kumu voting limit of 10 votes per account per day in a twist called "Unli-Voting." The twist drew some flak amongst avid and loyal viewers, claiming that "it is unfair" as the results wouldn't reflect the choices of the voting audience as a small amount of voters can drastically swing the results for or against a nominee in limited time. It was also seen as a sketchy move intended to save alleged management favorite Anji Salvacion, who was trailing Albie Casiño before unli-voting came into effect, and Salvacion was criticized by viewers for giving a harsh rebuke to fellow nominee KD Estrada, who was struggling with his mental health at the time, causing her to garner a lot of BBEs (votes to evict) prior to the unli-voting announcement.

By the time the voting closed, Salvacion overtook Casiño, who ended up being the second evictee. As a result, the hashtags #PBBUnfair and #PBBCancelUnliVotes trended on Twitter with the fans sending questions on executive producer and director Lauren Dyogi's Twitter, who then explained that they "initially planned it for the first nomination week but it didn't push through because of technical issues." After weeks of further criticism, especially after Estrada and fellow fan favorite Alexa Ilacad were both evicted on the same night, the twist was later cancelled for the Celebrity Batch's final eviction and, by extension, the rest of the season.

Eventually, Salvacion ended up as the season's Big Winner, which sparked criticism of vote-rigging in her favor due to the unexpected 22.21% gap between Salvacion and Isabel Laohoo, mainly from Estrada and Ilacad's supporters who dislike her due to her antagonism towards Estrada while they were inside the house, and also due to Laohoo's wealth being a factor in her getting landslide votes to save whenever she was up for eviction.

Inappropriate remarks
Brenda Mage received backlash from viewers after a clip of him giving inappropriate remarks went viral across social media platforms, which included inappropriate solicitation of sexual favors towards Eian Rances and offensive jokes. Mage apologized to Rances after being reminded by Big Brother in the confession room. Mage also received backlash for allegedly talking bad behind fellow housemate Alexa Ilacad due to both of their relationships with Rances, and the viewers were upset when a Kumu livestream clip showcased Mage talking harshly about Ilacad to his fellow housemate, Madam Inutz. Mage apologized to Ilacad after the conclusion of the Celebrity Edition. Mage eventually finished as the 5th Big Placer to a positive reception from the public, with many describing his second stint inside the house as his redemption arc.

Allegations of sexual misconduct
TJ Valderrama was subjected to controversy after he was spotted touching and looking at Shanaia Gomez in an allegedly sexual manner on several occasions by live feed viewers. This resulted in calls for his immediate removal from the house with the hashtag #ForceEvictTJ'' trending nationwide on November 20, 2021, alongside "Protect Shanaia Gomez." Gabriela Women's Party, a left-wing Filipino political party which advocates for the protection of women's rights, has also released a statement calling out the show regarding the issue. Moreover, the show and the housemates stated that there was nothing wrong happening, and that the viewers should be careful of what they accuse. Valderrama was eventually evicted on Day 51 while also being the sole housemate to receive a negative vote tally for the season.

References

Pinoy Big Brother seasons
2021 Philippine television seasons
2022 Philippine television seasons